Ruellia devosiana, the Brazilian wild petunia, is a green ornamental plant of the family Acanthaceae.

References

devosiana
Garden plants